Crantzia is a plant genus in the family Gesneriaceae. Crantzia species grow in damp or wet forests, mostly on Caribbean islands. Some are epiphytes, others are subshrubs or herbaceous plants with fibrous roots.

Several taxa from the Gesneriaceae genus Alloplectus have been reclassified as Crantzia.

Giovanni Antonio Scopoli named the genus after botanist and physician Heinrich Johann Nepomuk von Crantz (1722–1799).

References

External links
 Crantzia at The Plant List. Retrieved 30 December 2013.

Flora of the Caribbean
Gesnerioideae
Gesneriaceae genera